Fay is an American sitcom starring Lee Grant as the title character. The series aired on NBC from September 1975 to June 1976.

Synopsis
Grant stars as Fay Stewart, a divorced woman in her forties, who, after 25 years of marriage to attorney Jack Stewart, starts a new job and begins dating.

The show first aired on September 4, 1975, and was pulled after the October 23 airing (along with The Montefuscos, which aired in the time slot immediately before Fay). It returned for two more episodes on May 12 and June 2, 1976, for a total of ten episodes. Four of them ("Jack Remarries", "Mr. Wonderful", "Danny Falls In Love", and "Not Another Mother's Day") were eventually re-edited into an overseas theatrical feature, Man Trouble, later included in a syndicated package of other MCA/Universal "movies" stitched together from their various short-lived TV series.

The series is notable for Lee Grant's lashing out at NBC brass on The Tonight Show for the network's quick cancellation.

Grant was nominated for an Emmy for Outstanding Lead Actress in a Comedy Series but lost out to Mary Tyler Moore.

Cast
Lee Grant as Fay Stewart
Joe Silver as Jack Stewart
Margaret Willock as Linda Stewart Baines
Bill Gerber as Danny Messina
Stewart Moss as Elliott Baines
Norman Alden as Al Cassidy
Audra Lindley as Lillian

Episodes

References

External links
 
 
 Fay opening credits on YouTube
 Fay closing credits on YouTube

1975 American television series debuts
1976 American television series endings
1970s American sitcoms
Television series by Universal Television
NBC original programming
English-language television shows
Television shows set in San Francisco